Berardino Lombardi (born 10 May 1990) is an Italian motorcycle racer who has competed in the 125cc World Championship, the Supersport World Championship and the European Superstock 600 Championship. He won the CIV Stock 600 Championship in 2011.

Career statistics

Grand Prix motorcycle racing

By season

Races by year
(key)

Supersport World Championship

Races by year
(key)

References

External links
 

1990 births
Living people
Italian motorcycle racers
125cc World Championship riders
Supersport World Championship riders
Sportspeople from Benevento